The Ministry of Justice was one of the Russian Empire's central public institutions and was established on 8 September 1802. The ministry was headed by the Minister of Justice (who was at the same time the Senate Procurator General).

Structure 
 A Board of Consultation for the cases brought from the Senate before the Minister of Justice as Procurator General. 
 First Department. 
 Second Department.
 The Office of Surveys and the Surveying Institute (since 1870).
 Imperial School of Jurisprudence. 
 Moscow Archives of the Ministry of Justice. 
 The Council on Prison Affairs and the Chief Prisons Office (since 1895, transferred from Ministry of Interior).

See also 
 List of Justice Ministers of Imperial Russia

Sources 
 Statesman handbook for Russia. 1896.
 Encyclopedia of St. Petersburg

Justice
1802 establishments in the Russian Empire
1917 disestablishments in Russia